Padma Samten (formerly Alfredo Aveline) is a Brazilian Buddhist lama.

Alfredo Aveline has bachelor's and master's degrees in quantum physics from Universidade Federal do Rio Grande do Sul (UFRGS), where he was professor from 1969 to 1994. During those years, he studied quantum physics, a theory in which he found a similarity with Buddhist thought. In the early 1980s, his interest in Buddhism was intensified. In 1986, he founded Bodhisattva Center for Buddhist Studies (CEBB). In 1993, he was accepted by Chagdud Tulku Rinpoche as his disciple and in 1996 he was ordained lama, a title meaning leader, priest and teacher. Since that time, Lama Samten has traveled and taught, helping to structure and sustain practice groups throughout Brazil.

Lama Samten received training from teachers of various Buddhist traditions including Zen, and traveled to Asia on several occasions. He has contributed to bring masters, including Chagdud Tulku Rinpoche, B. Alan Wallace and the Dalai Lama, to Brazil. In Viamão (RS), where he resides, is located the temple, the school and the community houses of the Bodhisattva Center for Buddhist Studies (CEBB). Lama Samten has been a teacher, lecturer and consultant in companies, government agencies, hospitals, buddhist temples and universities.

Because of his work integrating Buddhism and mind training to the fields of psychology, medicine, economy and education, he has been awarded honorary citizenship in Curitiba (2008) and Viamão (2012).

Books
 A Jóia dos Desejos (ed. Fundação Peirópolis, 2001, brochura, 168 pág. )
 Meditando a Vida (ed. Fundação Peiropólis, 2001, brochura, 160 pág. )
 Mandala do Lótus (ed. Fundação Peiropólis, 2006, brochura, 160 pág. )
 O Lama e o Economista (ed. Rima, 2007, brochura, 121 pág. )
 A Roda da Vida  (ed. Fundação Peirópolis, 2010, capa dura, 160 pág. )

References

External links
 Bodhisattva Center for Buddhist Studies
 Teachings translated to english

Tibetologists
Brazilian Buddhists
Buddhist writers
1949 births
Living people
Nyingma lamas
20th-century lamas
Meditation